Following is a list of mayors of Robbins, Illinois, founded December 14, 1917, the first municipality in the north that was entirely governed by African-Americans. The first election was held on January 15, 1918 with Thomas J. Kellar elected as the mayor and six trustees empaneled (Richard Flowers, Leroy P. Thomas, R. H. Bryant, Jerry Taylor, Edward Brown, George Winburn).

References

Robbins